David Broughton Knox (26 December 1916 – 14 January 1994) was principal of Moore Theological College from 1959 until 1985; and considered by some as the "Father of Contemporary Sydney Anglicanism".

Knox was born in Adelaide and educated at Knox Grammar School and the University of Sydney. He was ordained deacon in 1941 and priest in 1942. After two years as a curate in Cambridge in England he was a RNVR chaplain during World War II. He began his long association with Moore Theological College in 1947.

Muriel Porter suggests that Knox's appointment as principal was "one of the most important events for the shaping of the Sydney Diocese as it is today", particularly in the way Knox's theology emphasised propositional revelation and his ecclesiology emphasised the local church.

References

Further reading
 
 

1916 births
1994 deaths
People educated at Knox Grammar School
University of Sydney alumni
Australian Anglican priests
Christian Young Earth creationists
20th-century Church of England clergy
Royal Naval Volunteer Reserve personnel of World War II
Evangelical Anglican clergy
Evangelical Anglican theologians
Academic staff of Moore Theological College